Reg Gulley (born 23 April 1969) is an Australian Liberal National politician who was the member of the Legislative Assembly of Queensland for Murrumba from 2012 to 2015, having defeated Dean Wells at the 2012 state election. He studied Commerce at the University of Queensland and attended Cromwell College.

Education
Gulley graduated in 1987 from Hervey Bay Senior College.

He studied for a Bachelor of Commerce from University of Queensland 1988–1990 and is a FCPA.

Prior to Parliament
Before being elected in 2012, Gulley worked for more than 20 years as a commercial manager across both corporate and not-for-profit sectors.  He held senior accounting roles in London, Sydney and Brisbane.

References

1969 births
Liberal National Party of Queensland politicians
Living people
Members of the Queensland Legislative Assembly
21st-century Australian politicians